Kaboud-val waterfall ( Persian: آبشار کبودوال ) also transliterated Kaboud vâl, is a waterfall in Iran's Golestan province. It is near the Aliabad-e katul city about 3 kilometers to the south.

Kaboud-val is the largest full-moss waterfall in Iran and is one of the prominent places in Golestan province. Its height is about six meters and its water is cool and potable.

Aliabad County
Waterfalls of Iran
Landforms of Golestan Province